Muddy Creek is a  long 4th order tributary to French Creek in Crawford County, Pennsylvania.

Course
Muddy Creek rises about 0.5 miles north-northwest of S Richmond Corners, Pennsylvania, and then flows east and turns northwest to join French Creek about 0.5 miles south of Millers Station, Pennsylvania.

Watershed
Muddy Creek drains  of area, receives about 45.2 in/year of precipitation, has a wetness index of 462.98, and is about 44% forested.

See also
 List of rivers of Pennsylvania

References

Rivers of Pennsylvania
Rivers of Crawford County, Pennsylvania